Knickerbocker Village Limited is a housing development situated between the Manhattan Bridge and Brooklyn Bridge, in the Two Bridges section of the Lower East Side of Manhattan, New York City. Although the location was generally considered to fall in the Lower East Side, it has come to be thought of as part of Chinatown in recent years and the majority of residents are Chinese. It is located a short distance from New York City Hall, Civic Center, and the South Street Seaport. The complex consists of 1,590 apartments in twelve 13-story brick buildings surrounding two courtyards at 10-12-14-16-18-20 Monroe Street and 30-32-34-36-38-40 Monroe Street on the Lower East Side, taking up two whole city blocks and bounded by Catherine Street, Monroe Street, Market Street, and Cherry Street. Knickerboker Village is in ZIP Code 10002.

History 
The land that is now Knickerbocker Village was previously home to one hundred buildings that were deemed slums and torn down. These actions were later criticized as some of the earliest gentrification in Manhattan. When the United States Congress authorized the RFC to make loans on slum clearance projects, French picked out the worst block in his holdings and presented it as a worthy subject for clearance. His choice was "Lung Block," so called because of its high tuberculosis mortality rate, where 650 families lived. French proposed to build a low-cost housing project. RFC lent 97% of the required $10 million. The average cost of "Lung Block" to Knickerbocker Village was high: $3.116 million, or $14 per square foot. The development's tax assessment was reduced by two-thirds to bring the monthly room rental down to the $12.50 stipulated by the RFC. Because the average rental before construction of the development had been about $5 a room, Knickerbocker Village no longer served the same low-income families that had lived in the "Lung Block" housing. It was filled with white collar workers. Eighty-two percent of the families who moved into the apartments were soon forced to move back to the slums they had left because of escalating rents.

While the Great Depression altered his original plans, real estate developer Fred F. French began construction of Knickerbocker Village in 1933 and completed it in 1934. As a project of the Reconstruction Finance Corporation (RFC), which Congress authorized to extend loans to private developers for the construction of low-income housing in slum areas, Knickerbocker Village was the first apartment development in the United States to receive federal funding, with 98% of the money from the project going to the Knickerbocker Village. It provided 1,590 small apartments primarily to small middle-income families. The RFC was supposed to help revive the construction industry and increase the supply of low-income housing in New York. 

Due to French's poor actions as a landlord, the complex became known for its tenant organizing activities and creation of some of the first landlord-tenant laws and the current rent control regulations.

After fifty years, French sold the complex to new owners in the 1970s.

21st century
The property suffered severe damage from Hurricane Sandy in 2012 and ultimately received significant funds from the city's "Build it Back" program. The complex became one of the first affordable housing complexes with facial recognition technology.
A tax break in 2019 put an end to a five year fight to prevent a significant rent increase that would have made the property unaffordable to most tenants.

Notable residents
Notable residents have included:
Cheng Chui Ping, 'Snakehead', human smuggler lived at 14 Monroe Street in the 1980s-early 1990s.
Mark Olf, the Jewish folksinger and Folkways recording artist
 Peter C. Rhodes, reporter and writer
Julius Rosenberg and Ethel Rosenberg, who were convicted of spying for the Soviet Union and later executed, lived on the eleventh floor in 10 Monroe Street at Knickerbocker Village.
Frederik Pohl, the American editor and writer.
Benjamin Ruggiero of the Bonanno crime family, portrayed by Al Pacino in the movie Donnie Brasco

References

External links
 
 

Lower East Side
Public housing in Manhattan